The Hallelujah Trail is a 1965 American Western mockumentary spoof directed by John Sturges, with top-billed stars Burt Lancaster, Lee Remick, Jim Hutton and Pamela Tiffin. It was based on the book of the same title (originally released as "The Hallelujah Train") by Bill Gulick in 1963.

The film was one of several large-scale widescreen, long-form "epic" comedies produced in the 1960s, much like The Great Race and It's a Mad, Mad, Mad, Mad World, combined with the epic grandeur of the Western genre. Its running time is 2 hours, 45 minutes. The film is part of a group, which were filmed in Ultra Panavision 70 and presented in selected theaters via the oversized Super Cinerama process. Stuntman Bill Williams was killed on November 13, 1964, while performing a stunt involving a wagon going over a cliff. The scene was kept in the movie.

On October 19, 1968, three years and four months after its release, the film had its television premiere in a three-hour timeslot on NBC Saturday Night at the Movies.

Plot
In the year 1867, signs that the approaching winter will be a hard one produce agitation in the burgeoning mining town of Denver, as the hard-drinking citizenry fear a shortage of whiskey. Taking advice from Oracle Jones, a local guide and seer (but only when under the influence of alcohol), the populace arrange for a mass shipment of forty wagons full of whiskey to be delivered by the Wallingham Freighting Company. The whiskey wagon train heads out under the direction of company owner Frank Wallingham, who repeatedly describes himself as "a taxpayer and a good Republican".

This cargo becomes the target for several diverse groups, each with their own leaders and plans. Young Capt. Paul Slater of the United States Cavalry is assigned by Fort Russell commander Col. Thaddeus Gearhart to escort the Wallingham Wagon Train, and merely wishes to carry out his orders. A group of Irish teamsters, hired as wagon drivers, wishes to strike unless whiskey rations are distributed. Twice-widowed, crusading temperance leader Cora Templeton Massingale and her followers, informed of the alcoholic cargo, wish to intercept the train and destroy its contents; the group therefore sets out escorted by a second cavalry division under the command of a reluctant Col. Gearhart.

Gearhart's daughter is engaged to Capt. Slater but entranced by Mrs. Massingale's message. Despite their extremely different personalities and inability to see eye to eye, the weatherbeaten Gearhart and beautiful Cora Massingale fall in love. Beneath her composure and grace, and even her occasional ribbing against him, Cora is infatuated with Gearhart from the moment he rides into the fort and spends much of the film trying subtly to win his affection.

Other interested parties include Sioux Indians, led by chiefs Five Barrels and Walks-Stooped-Over, and a Denver citizens' militia, led by Clayton Howell and guided by Oracle Jones, concerned about obtaining their precious supply of drinkables. Inevitably the various groups converge, and the ensuing property struggle is played out through a series of comic set pieces and several diplomatic overtures by an increasingly weary Gearhart. Highlights include a massive shoot-out between the concerned parties within a blinding sandstorm without a single injury, a hostage situation when the Indians capture the Temperance members in order to reinforce their demands for alcoholic drink, and Massingale tricking Wallingham into riding his entire wagon train into a quicksand bog, where the wagons and their cargo sink into the pits. The participants then disperse, mostly disappointed; however, for Colonel Gearhart and Captain Slater the story ends with a double wedding, for Wallingham and Oracle with a lifetime supply of whiskey when buoyancy causes the barrels to erupt from the quicksand, and for the winter of 1867 to actually become one of the mildest ever.

Cast

 Burt Lancaster as Colonel Thaddeus Gearhart
 Lee Remick as Cora Templeton Massingale
 Jim Hutton as Captain Paul Slater
 Pamela Tiffin as Louise Gearhart
 Donald Pleasence as Oracle Jones
 Brian Keith as Frank Wallingham
 Martin Landau as Walks-Stooped-Over
 John Anderson as Sergeant Buell
 Tom Stern as Kevin O'Flaherty
 Robert J. Wilke as Chief 5 Barrels

 Dub Taylor as Clayton Howell
 Whit Bissell as Hobbs, the newspaper editor
 Helen Kleeb as Henrietta, one of the temperance women
 Val Avery as bartender in Denver
 Noam Pitlik as Indian interpreter
 Billy Benedict as Simpson, one of the miners
 Hope Sommers as Mrs. Hasselrad, one of the temperance women
 Ted Markland as bandmaster of Company B

 Larry Duran as one of the brothers-in-law
 Jerry Gatlin as one of the brothers-in-law
 Marshall Reed as Lieutenant Carter, a member of the Cavalry
 James Burk as Elks Runner, one of the Indians
 John McKee as Rafe Pike, one of the townspeople
 Bing Russell as Homer, one of the miners
 Buff Brady as Bilkins, one of the miners
 Carl Pitti as Phillips, one of the cavalry troopers

Narration
The film is presented in a pseudo-documentary style, with a tongue-in-cheek narrator (unbilled John Dehner) providing historical background and context, and periodically interrupting the story to point out animated charts illustrating strategic positions of various groups.

Opening
"The land at first — mountains… thrust forth from the molten darkness of the earth. Mountain and valley… the virgin West. High plateau… and red rock of sandstone — wilderness West. Prairie land… rolling on and on… to the end of sight. Oh, pioneer West! What fervent dreams lay half-buried in this land of promise — dreams crushed by a cruel nature — or the lance of an Indian warrior.

"Every page in history must have its beginning… and ours takes us to the year eighteen sixty-seven. An Army that had fought in the War Between the States — that had bravely battled in many an Indian campaign — now patrolled the West in a time of peace… with ever-present thoughts of home. The Indian was back on the reservation… where the Peace Commission of eighteen sixty-seven had met with various warlike tribes and secured certain promises from them… in return, papers were given the Indians certifying them to be good citizens who would obey the laws of the land. Many gifts were distributed… beads… pieces of cloth… ammunition… and war surplus rifles. Naturally, these rifles were quite unfamiliar to the Indians… and, of course, it was understood, these weapons were to be used solely for the purpose of hunting game.

"The leaves turned early in that year. It could be a long, hard winter. The signs were everywhere — in the high country, the morning frost would sometimes last until afternoon. Buffalo were feeding ravenously. Beaver were damming and storing with strange vigor. Horses and dogs were becoming shaggy-haired as never before. And it could be sensed in the booming, bustling mining town of Denver. Most historians agree that the events leading to the Battle of Whiskey Hills and the subsequent disaster at Quicksand Bottoms began here in Denver at a miners' meeting. Such meetings were frequent and held, usually, as part of the political fabric of the town. But the meeting of November fourth had a marked air of grim foreboding..."

Closing
"Companies A and B of the Cavalry escorted the ex-temperance marchers back to their husbands and hungry children at Fort Russell. It is to be assumed, some time passed before the Indians were able to regain their customary composure. But it is known that the exploits of their journey became tribal legend…to be told over and over again, from generation to generation… with slight revisions. The Denver free militia dissolved… never to march again. And of course, the strike of the Irish teamsters failed…and the Wallingham freighting company went bankrupt, having no visible assets....

"So ended the great disaster at Quicksand Bottoms. Oh, yes…Mrs. Massingale…Cora Templeton Massingale retired from all active participation in temperance movements. A military wedding was held at Fort Russell. As it turned out…it was a double wedding. A homestead claim was filed by Mister Jones and Mister Wallingham on a piece of land encompassing the entire Quicksand Bottoms area.

"It's not to be denied that there were occasional re-emergences of whisky kegs, which kept Mister Jones and Mister Wallingham…eeh…eeeh…quite…content for a number of years… and, in spite of all predictions, shaggy hair and busy beaver to the contrary, the winter of eighteen sixty-seven turned out to be the driest and warmest on record. Such was the year…oh, pioneer West…and the days of the Hallelujah Trail."

Evaluation in film guides
Leonard Maltin's Movie Guide (2013 edition) gives The Hallelujah Trail 2½ stars (out of 4) describing Lee Remick's character as a "rambunctious temperance leader" and concluding the write-up with "amiable but lumbering Western satire goes on and on". The capsule review also mentions that the film "includes an overture, intermission/entr'acte, exit music". Steven H. Scheuer's Movies on TV (1972–73 edition) had a much lower opinion, giving it its lowest rating of 1 star (out of 4) and deciding that there is "[V]ery little to cheer about in this muddled western saga, as director John Sturges and the stars stumble down a long — almost three hours — and banal path that has been explored much more satisfactorily by countless film makers in the past". Describing the plot as "clumsy" and singling out "thirsty Hollywood-caricature Indians", the review concludes that "Lancaster looks understandably bored to death, and Lee Remick is miscast and wasted". By the time of the 1986–87 edition, Scheuer slightly ups the rating to 1½ stars and shortens the capsule to a single sentence which calls it a "clumsy comedy" and mentions the "thirsty Indians".

The Motion Picture Guide (1987 edition) assigned 2½ stars (out of 5), concluding that "[B]asically, this is one-joke plot with a few vignettes and gags strung on along the way. The whole thing is held together by an understated narration by Dehner, which itself is fairly clever. Still, the depiction of the Indians in this film is more than a little unsettling."

Two additional guides rank the production slightly higher and lower — Mick Martin's and Marsha Porter's DVD & Video Guide (2007 edition) dispenses 3 stars (out of 5), reminding that "[T]hose who fondly remember television's F Troop should adore this cavalry comedy", concluding that it is "[O]verlong, but fun nonetheless", while Videohound's Golden Movie Retriever (2011 edition) throws it only two bones (out of possible four), mentioning Lee Remick's "bevy of ladies against liquor" standing "between the shipment and the would-be whistle whetters" and concluding that it is a "[L]imp Western satire directed by Preston Sturges' brother [Videohound is incorrect — the two directors were not related], who fared much better when he kept a straight face (he also directed The Great Escape)".

Among British references, Leslie Halliwell, in his Film and Video Guide (5th edition, 1985), gave no stars (Halliwell's top rating is 4), dismissing it as an "[A]bsurdly inflated, prolonged, uninventive comedy western with poor narrative grip; all dressed up and nowhere to go".

Comic book adaption
 Dell Movie Classic: The Hallelujah Trail (February 1966)

See also

 List of American films of 1965

References

External links
 
 
 
 
 
 The Hallelujah Trail at TV Guide (shortened and revised version of 1987 write-up originally published in The Motion Picture Guide)

1965 films
1965 comedy films
1960s Western (genre) comedy films
1960s parody films
American Western (genre) comedy films
American Western (genre) epic films
American mockumentary films
Films adapted into comics
Films based on American novels
Films based on Western (genre) novels
Films directed by John Sturges
Films scored by Elmer Bernstein
Films set in 1867
Films set in Colorado
Films with screenplays by John Gay (screenwriter)
United Artists films
Western (genre) cavalry films
1960s English-language films
1960s American films
Comedy epic films